Anomoea laticlavia (Persimmon beetle, Clay-colored leaf beetle) is a reddish-brown and black leaf beetle native to central and eastern North America.  It feeds on the leaves of Fabaceae, persimmons, and other species in its adult phase.

Description
A. laticlavia adults are 7 to 12mm. It is recognizable with variable width black suture on a reddish-brown elytron. Males' front legs are relatively large.
A. laticlavia is in the unranked taxon Camptosomata, or case-bearing leaf beetles.

Ecology
Larvae are subterranean root or litter feeders. Reported adult host-plants include legumes, oaks, willows, persimmon, and ragweed. Some Florida populations are identified as a subspecies.

See also
Leaf beetle

References

External links
 EOL 

Beetles of North America
Clytrini
Beetles described in 1771
Taxa named by Johann Reinhold Forster